The European Wrestling Championships is the second oldest international wrestling competition of the modern world and the main wrestling championships in Europe. It predates World Wrestling Championships and other regional wrestling championships and is second only to the wrestling events at the Olympics. From its inception in 1898 till 1927 only Greco-Roman wrestling was contested. Since 1929 separate freestyle wrestling events were held as well. Since 1970 the two Olympic wrestling styles were contested together during the same unified events. Since 1973 Sambo wrestling was included into the championships programme along with GR and freestyle wrestling (subsequently discontinued and from 1983 contested separately). Since 2014 associated traditional wrestling styles recognized globally by UWW were incorporated into the annual championships schedule.

Summary 
Until 2005 there was held separate championships for each wrestling style. First women championships was held in 1988.

Pre 1911

Post 1911

 FS : Freestyle / GR : Greco-Roman / LF : Women's Freestyle
 Until 2018 : 67 GR, 60 FS, 24 LF

Medal summary

Youth Wrestling

European U23 Wrestling Championships
The European U23 Wrestling Championships is main wrestling championships in Europe.

Medals U23

European Espoirs Wrestling Championships (U20)

The European Espoirs Wrestling Championships is main wrestling championships in Europe.

LL : Freestyle / GR : Greco-Roman / LF : Women's Freestyle

European Juniors Wrestling Championship (U20)

The European Juniors Wrestling Championships is main wrestling championships in Europe.

LL : Freestyle / GR : Greco-Roman / LF : Women's Freestyle

European Cadets Wrestling Championship (U17)

The European Cadets Wrestling Championships is main wrestling championships in Europe.

{| 
|

LL : Freestyle / GR : Greco-Roman / LF : Women's Freestyle

European Schools Wrestling Championship (U15)

The European Schools Wrestling Championships is main wrestling championships in Europe.

Traditional wrestling

European Sambo Championships

Among the decisions taken during the 1973 FILA Congress, held under the FILA President Milan Ercegan, Sambo, a special form of wrestling particularly practised in the USSR and Asia, was recognized. Among the decisions taken during the Congress, Sambo for the first time was included in the programme of the 1974 European Wrestling Championships (along with GR and freestyle.) During the Congress, the attribution of the next freestyle wrestling, Greco-Roman wrestling and Sambo championships was decided as follows: European Championships: 1974 at Madrid (Spain,) 1975 at Ludwigshafen (West Germany,) 1976 in Turkey. World Championships: 1974 at Tehran. Junior European Championships: 1974 at Poznan (Poland.) Junior World Championships: 1973 at Miami (USA.) After the Soviet invasion of Afghanistan, anti-Soviet international sentiment led to a discontinuation of Sambo from the Championships programme.

European Grappling Championships

The European Grappling Championships (GP) is main traditional wrestling championships in Europe.

Sources:

European Pankration Championships

The European Pankration Championships (PK) is main traditional wrestling championships in Europe.

Sources:

European Alysh Championships

The European Alysh Championships (Belt Wrestling Alysh or BWUWW or AL) is main traditional wrestling championships in Europe.

Sources:

European Pahlavani Championships

The European Pahlavani Championships (Pahlavani Wrestling or PW) is main traditional wrestling championships in Europe.

Sources:

European Kazak Kuresi Championships

The European Kazak Kuresi Championships (Kazakh Wrestling or KK) is main traditional wrestling championships in Europe.

Sources:

European Beach Wrestling Championships

The European Beach Wrestling Championships (BW) is main traditional wrestling championships in Europe.

 Until 2018 no competition.

See also 

 World Wrestling Championships (formerly FILA Wrestling World Championships)
 European U23 Wrestling Championships

References

External links
 FILA Database
 European Wrestling Council official website

 
Wrestling competitions
Sambo (martial art) competitions

wrestling